Benson's algorithm, named after Harold Benson, is a method for solving multi-objective linear programming problems and vector linear programs.  This works by finding the "efficient extreme points in the outcome set".  The primary concept in Benson's algorithm is to evaluate the upper image of the vector optimization problem by cutting planes.

Idea of algorithm 
Consider a vector linear program

In particular, Benson's algorithm finds the extreme points of the set , which is called upper image.

Dual algorithm 
There is a dual variant of Benson's algorithm, which is based on geometric duality for multi-objective linear programs.

Implementations 
Bensolve - a free VLP solver
 www.bensolve.org
Inner
 Link to github

References 

Linear programming
Optimization algorithms and methods